State Route 197 (SR 197) is a  state highway that travels completely within the north-central part of Bullock County in the U.S. state of Alabama. It serves as an alternate route between U.S. Route 29 (US 29) and US 82 through Union Springs. SR 197 is also signed as U.S. Route 29 Truck (US 29 Truck) and Martin Luther King Boulevard.

Route description
SR 197 begins at an intersection with US 29 (South Prairie Street) in the south-central part of Union Springs. The route travels to the north-northeast on Martin Luther King Boulevard South. After passing L Avenue, it curves to a nearly due-north orientation and continues this direction until it meets its northern terminus, an intersection with US 29/US 82 in the central part of Union Springs.

SR 197 is not part of the National Highway System, a system of roadways important to the nation's economy, defense, and mobility.

Major intersections

See also

References

External links

197
Transportation in Bullock County, Alabama
U.S. Route 29